Tempe Accelerated High School is a public charter high school in Tempe, Arizona. It is operated by The Leona Group.

Public high schools in Arizona
The Leona Group
Charter schools in Arizona
Schools in Maricopa County, Arizona